The Timor green pigeon (Treron psittaceus) is a species of bird in the family Columbidae. It is found on the islands of Rote and Timor. Its natural habitat is subtropical or tropical moist lowland forests.
It is threatened by habitat loss.

Distribution and habitat 
The Timor green pigeon is found on the islands of Rote, Timor, Semau, and Atauro in the Lesser Sundas.

Behaviour and ecology 
The Timor green pigeon is frugivorous and has been recorded feeding on figs.

References

External links
BirdLife Species Factsheet.

Timor green pigeon
Birds of Timor
Endangered animals
Endangered biota of Asia
Timor green pigeon
Taxonomy articles created by Polbot